The Somerset and Dorset Joint Railway (S&DJR) Sentinel locomotives were two small vertical-boilered, chain-driven steam locomotives for shunting.  They were built by Sentinel Waggon Works, who also produced similar designs for industrial customers.


Service 

The two locomotives were both built in 1929 and given the S&DJR numbers 101 and 102. The locomotives replaced three older Highbridge-built saddle tanks, 24A, 25A and 45A. They were both used for shunting coal wagons on the colliery branchlines around Radstock. They were built to a reduced loading gauge as they had to pass under the Tyning Arch which had only  clearance.

They were taken into London, Midland and Scottish Railway (LMS) stock in 1930 and renumbered 7190–7191. After nationalisation in 1948, they became 47190–47191 under British Railways. 47191 was withdrawn in 1959 from Bath Green Park and 47190 in 1961 from Bristol (Barrow Road). Both were scrapped.

Preservation 

Neither of the Radstock Sentinels survived into preservation. However, a similar locomotive, former Croydon Gasworks No. 37 Joyce (works number 7109), originally built in 1927, is restored and running at the  Somerset & Dorset Railway Heritage Trust at Midsomer Norton railway station.

References

External links 
 Class SENT2 Details at Rail UK

Sentinels
0-4-0T locomotives
Sentinel locomotives
Railway locomotives introduced in 1929
Standard gauge steam locomotives of Great Britain
Shunting locomotives